The Former Montana Executive Mansion, also known as the Original Governor's Mansion, is the official residence of the Governor of Montana. It is located in Helena, Montana, the capital. It is listed on the National Register of Historic Places in 1970.

Original Mansion
In 1913, the state of Montana acquired a mansion to serve as the official residence for the governor of Montana. The house and carriage house were built originally in 1888 by William Chessman. Between 1913 and 1959, it was home to nine Montana governors and their families.

Originally known as the William Chessman Mansion and after 1959 as the Governor's  Old Mansion, it was built in 1888.  It is in Queen Anne style, and was designed by the St. Paul, Minnesota, firm of  Hodgson, Stem, & Welter.  It is a three-story building built of pressed brick, terra cotta and stone.  The interior has seven fireplaces and 20 rooms.

Current Governor's residence
The current Montana Governor's Residence is located at 2 Carson  Helena, Montana. It began operation as the governor's residence in 1959, replacing the original governor's mansion. The residence is a two-level steel and brick house located two blocks from the Montana State Capitol building. It was designed by architect Chandler C. Cohagen.

References

Sources
 Original Governor's Mansion Self-Guided Tour

External links
 Visiting information for the Old Governor's Mansion
Original Governor's Mansion Restoration Society

Governors' mansions in the United States
Houses on the National Register of Historic Places in Montana
Queen Anne architecture in Montana
Houses completed in 1888
Museums in Lewis and Clark County, Montana
Historic house museums in Montana
Houses in Lewis and Clark County, Montana
Tourist attractions in Helena, Montana
1888 establishments in Montana Territory
National Register of Historic Places in Helena, Montana